William Marion Hougland (June 20, 1930 – March 6, 2017) was an American basketball player who competed in the 1952 Summer Olympics and in the 1956 Summer Olympics. He was also a member of the Kansas Jayhawks' 1952 NCAA Men's Basketball National Championship team.

He was a member of the 1952 American basketball team, which won the gold medal. He played all eight matches.
He played for the Phillips 66ers in the National Industrial Basketball League.  He won his second gold medal as part of the 1956 American Olympic team.

Hougland died on March 6, 2017, in Lawrence, Kansas, aged 86.

References

External links
profile

1930 births
2017 deaths
Basketball players at the 1952 Summer Olympics
Basketball players at the 1956 Summer Olympics
Basketball players from Kansas
Kansas Jayhawks men's basketball players
Medalists at the 1952 Summer Olympics
Medalists at the 1956 Summer Olympics
Olympic gold medalists for the United States in basketball
People from Caldwell, Kansas
Phillips 66ers players
Point guards
United States men's national basketball team players
American men's basketball players